Vijayīndra Tīrtha (also known as Vijayendra Tīrtha) (1514 - 1595) was a Dvaita philosopher and dialectician. A prolific writer and an unrelenting polemicist, he is said to have authored 104 treatises expounding the principles of Dvaita and defending it against attacks from the contemporary orthodox schools of Vedanta. He held the pontifical seat at Kumbakonam under the rule of Thanjavur Nayaks where he participated in polemical discussions with the Advaita philosopher Appayya Dikshita  Inscriptions from that era record grants of villages received by Vijayindra for his triumph over theological debates . Legend ascribes to him mastery over 64 arts and his erudition, writes Sharma, "is evident from a few of his works bearing on Purva Mimamsa, Nyaya and Kavya literature".

Life
Almost nothing is known about his early life and family. Most of the information on Vijayindra is derived from a few inscriptions and two hagiographies: Rāghavendra Vijaya and Guruguṇastavana. Born as Vitthalācharya in a Kannada-speaking Deshastha Madhva Brahmin family, he studied Vedanta, Mimamsa and Nyaya under the philosopher Vyasatirtha.  He also received training in Kavya (poetics), Natya (drama) and Alankara (rhetoric). Aged 25, he moved to Kumbakonam at the behest of Surendra Tirtha, the erstwhile pontiff of the Vibhudendra mutt.  Vitthala eventually succeeded Surendra as the pontiff with the title Vijayīndra Tīrtha.
Inscriptional evidence and traditional accounts note that Vijayindra received patronage from Aliya Rama Raya and grants from Sevappa Nayak of Tanjore.    He was involved in severe polemical  discussions with his rival and friend Appayya Dikshita, with several of his works dedicated to refuting the claims of Appayya.  After his death in 1595, his mortal remains were enshrined in the mutt at Kumbakonam. He was succeeded by Sudhindra Tirtha.

Works
Vijayindra tirtha is credited with as many as 104 literary works of which many are non-extant. A few that remain mainly consist of commentaries on the works of Vyasatirtha (Laghu Amoda) and Madhva (Tattvaprakasika Tippani), polemical works refuting the works of Appayya Dikshita and several treatises dealing with the issue of compatibility of Dvaita with Mimamsa (Chakra Mimamsa). A few poems and three dramatical works have been attributed to him as well.

List of Notable Works
104 works are attributed to Vijayindra of which only sixty are extant. Except for a few notable works, many remain unprinted. The manuscripts are preserved in mutts at Nanjangud, Mantralayam and Kumbakonam.

Notes

References

Bibliography

External links
Vijayindra Tirtha and the origin of Kashi Math
Biographical Sketch on Vijayindra Tirtha

Vaishnavite religious leaders
Dvaita Vedanta
Dvaitin philosophers